Mioawateria expalliata is an extinct species of sea snail, a marine gastropod mollusk in the family Raphitomidae.

Description

Distribution
Fossils of this marine species were found in New Zealand
.

References

 Laws, C. R. Tertiary Mollusca from Hokianga District, North Auckland. AU, 1947
 Maxwell, P.A. (2009). Cenozoic Mollusca. pp 232–254 in Gordon, D.P. (ed.) New Zealand inventory of biodiversity. Volume one. Kingdom Animalia: Radiata, Lophotrochozoa, Deuterostomia. Canterbury University Press, Christchurch..

expalliata
Gastropods described in 1947
Gastropods of New Zealand